was a village located in Kitakoma District, Yamanashi Prefecture, Japan. Its territory includes Yama-Ogasawara, the village which gave its name to Ogasawara Nagakiyo, his clan of samurai, andeventuallyto the Ogasawara Islands in the North Pacific south of Tokyo. (Ogasawara itself is twinned with another locationHara-Ogasawara in nearby Minami-Alpsdue to the similar names.)

As of 2003, the village had an estimated population of 4,750 and a density of 169.04 persons per km². The total area was 28.10 km².

On November 1, 2004, Akeno, along with the towns of Hakushū, Nagasaka, Sutama and Takane, and the villages of Mukawa and Ōizumi (all from Kitakoma District), was merged to create the city of Hokuto.

External links
Akeno official website of Hokuto city (in Japanese)

Dissolved municipalities of Yamanashi Prefecture
Hokuto, Yamanashi